The following lists events that happened during 1819 in Chile.

Incumbents
Supreme Director of Chile: Bernardo O'Higgins

Events

February 
 23 February - Battle of Mesamávida

March 
 1–10 March - Siege of Los Angeles

May 
 1 May - Battle of Caralí

September 
 19 September - Battle of Quilmo

November 
 1 November - Battle of Tritalco
 20 November - Battle of Hualqui

December 
 7 December - Battle of Píleo
 10 December - Battle of El Avellano
 19 December - Battle of Yumbel
 29 December - Battle of San Pedro

Births
 19 April - Hermógenes Irisarri (d. 1886)

Deaths
 Date unknown - Ignacio de la Carrera

References 

 
1810s in Chile
Chile
Chile